The Jewish Mind is a non-fiction cultural psychology book by cultural anthropologist Raphael Patai first published in 1977.

Contents
Part I, "Preliminaries", lays the groundwork for the rest of the book. Part II, "Six Great Historic Encounters", reviews  the formative and lasting influences on the Jewish mind of each period. In Part III, Patai analyzes the specific traits, characteristics and values shaping the Jewish mind during the prolonged and diverse Gentile exposure.

See also 
The Arab Mind

References

1977 non-fiction books
Books about Jews and Judaism
Charles Scribner's Sons books